Norðurá ("north river") is a river that runs through the Borgarfjörður region in central west Iceland.
 It is a tributary of the Hvítá.
Its origins are in Lake Holtavörðuvatn at 326 m altitude.

References

Rivers of Iceland
Borgarbyggð